Rasmus Winther Højlund (born 4 February 2003) is a Danish professional footballer who plays as a forward for  club Atalanta and the Denmark national team.

Club career

Copenhagen
Højlund began his professional career at his hometown club Copenhagen in 2020. During the 2021–22 season, he made his debut in European competitions, contributing five goals in the UEFA Europa Conference League across qualification rounds and the tournament proper.

Sturm Graz
In January 2022, Højlund joined Austrian Bundesliga club Sturm Graz for a reported fee of €1.8 million. He scored 12 goals in 21 games across all competitions during the remainder of the 2021–22 season and the start of the 2022–23 season.

Atalanta
On 27 August 2022, Højlund signed with Serie A club Atalanta in a deal worth a reported €17 million. He scored his first goal for Atalanta on 5 September in a 2–0 away win over Monza.

Career statistics

Club

International

References

External links
Profile at the Atalanta B.C. website
Rasmus Højlund at DBU

2003 births
Living people
Danish men's footballers
Association football forwards
Boldklubben af 1893 players
Brøndby IF players
F.C. Copenhagen players
Holbæk B&I players
SK Sturm Graz players
Atalanta B.C. players
Danish Superliga players
Austrian Football Bundesliga players
Serie A players
Denmark youth international footballers
Denmark under-21 international footballers
Denmark international footballers
Danish expatriate men's footballers
Danish expatriate sportspeople in Austria
Danish expatriate sportspeople in Italy
Expatriate footballers in Austria
Expatriate footballers in Italy